Nevesia is a monotypic genus of lichenized fungus in the family Pannariaceae. It contains the species Nevesia sampaiana. The genus name honors Carlos das Neves Tavares, the Portuguese lichenologist who first identified the species in 1950.

References

 
 
 
 

Lichen genera
Peltigerales
Monotypic Lecanoromycetes genera
Taxa named by Per Magnus Jørgensen
Taxa described in 2014